Edson Coldren "Babe" Rupp Sr. (October 10, 1889 – February 8, 1960) was an American college football player and coach. He served as the head football coach at Denison University from 1928 to 1930, compiling a record of 8–16–1.

Head coaching record

References

External links
 

1889 births
1960 deaths
Denison Big Red football coaches
Denison Big Red football players
People from Marion, Ohio